Ek Paheli Leela is a 2015 Indian Hindi-language romantic thriller drama film, written and directed by Bobby Khan and produced by Bhushan Kumar and Krishan Kumar. It stars Sunny Leone in the titular lead role with Jay Bhanushali, Rajneesh Duggal, Jas Arora, Mohit Ahlawat and Rahul Dev in pivotal roles. Choreography is done by Ahmed Khan and Jojo Khan. The music for the film is composed by Meet Bros Anjjan and Amaal Mallik. Principal photography of the film began in Jodhpur, India.

The film is a reincarnation story which is set 300 years back, and revolves around the story of an Egyptian princess named Leela (Sunny Leone) and her lover. Their love story remains incomplete as they are murdered. The film portrays how their story completes when they both are reincarnated in present time.

The trailer of the film was released on 6 February 2015 and became YouTube's most viewed Bollywood movie trailer of the first quarter of 2015. The film received positive reviews from the critics upon release and was a commercial success.

Plot 
Karan (Jay Bhanushali) is a singer/musician who moves to a new house in Mumbai along with his friends. He often helps his sister Radhika (Shivani Tanksale) and Andy – his sister's colleague (both are fashion photographers) with music for their fashion shows.

Radhika wants to get her friend Meera (Sunny Leone) for her fashion shows featuring in India but Meera is reluctant. Hence, Radhika with the help of her friend Andy (VJ Andy) take her to India on an aeroplane by making her drunk (induced drowsiness). After they arrive in India, Meera discovers the truth and gets angry. Meanwhile, her mood changes as she sees Rajasthani girls playing a traditional game and starts to play with them forgetting her plight.

While in India, Meera meets royalty -Ranveer Singh (Mohit Ahlawat), a Rajput prince, in Rajasthan. The two eventually fall in love and get married. The prince Ranveer is in middle of a property dispute with his cousin Bikram Singh (Jas Arora).

Meanwhile, back home, Karan has persistent dreams of someone whipping him and many times he wakes up from his sleep shouting loudly " Leela! Leela!" . In an attempt to figure why, his friends takes him to a Pandit (Naadi palm leaf reader) who tells him that his pain is rooted in his past life of 300 years ago.

With the help from the Pandit, Karan travels through his past and they find out that he must be Shravan (Rajneesh Duggal), who was in love with a girl called Leela (also played by Sunny Leone) but his master, an artist, Bhairao (Rahul Dev) adopts her as his muse. Bhairao makes a statue of Leela and discovers that Leela is in love with Shravan. In a fit of rage, Bhairao kills both Shravan and Leela by pushing them into a bottomless pit of fire.

With the advise from Pandit, Karan gets some courage to visit a place called' Bhairao Virajana' (the place of dispute between Ranveer and Bikram). This place is under dispute because both the Prince Ranveer and Bikram know that a statue of "Leela" is hidden in the midst of its ruins, which is worth a billion dollars.

Bikram finds out that Karan is trespassing his property and brings him to Prince Ranveer to inform him that their property is now being invaded by unknown strangers.

Inside the palace, Karan meets Meera and tries to remind Meera about their past but Meera does not believe him. Karan plays a song "Tere Bin" that takes Meera back into their past and she recollects her past life as the beautiful Leela...Bikram overhears all the conversations and knows that the secret of where the statue of Leela is hidden can be known by kidnapping Karan and Meera and forcing them to spill the beans.

With the help of a some henchmen, Meera and Karan get kidnapped by Bikram who is looking for a statue that Bhairao had made. The current market value of the statue is $10 billion and Bikram wants to keep the money for himself. Bikram starts harassing Meera so that she would tell him where the statue is hidden, and therefore under duress and to save Meera, Karan reveals that the statue was hidden behind a wall, and then when Bikram gets to the statue, Prince Ranveer arrives and pierces Bikram's hand with a sword.

At the end, Karan realizes that he was actually the reincarnation of Bhairao and not of Shravan (who got reincarnated in Ranveer). Karan tries to redeem his ills by committing suicide but Meera and Ranveer don't let him.

Karan's album "Tere Bin" gets him fame and the story ends happily ever after.

Cast 
Sunny Leone as Leela (first birth)/Meera Singh (reborn with same face and married to Ranveer) 
Rajneesh Duggal as Shravan (Leela's lover in her previous birth) 
Jay Bhanushali as Karan (reincarnation of Bhairao)
Rahul Dev as Bhairao
Mohit Ahlawat as Prince Ranveer Singh (rebirth of Shravan and now married to Meera)
Jas Arora as Prince Bikram Singh 
Shivani Tanksale as Radhika Randhawa
VJ Andy as himself
Ahsaan Qureshi as Maan Singh
Daniel Weber as Flight Pilot (Cameo appearance)
Sandeep Bhojak as Jaswant Singh

Production 
The film is produced by Bhushan Kumar's company T-Series and Ahmed Khan's own production company Paperdoll Entertainment.

Development 

Bobby Khan stated that Sunny Leone was the only actress suitable for the roles . He also stated that big actors refused to do the film because of Leone. Actor Mohit Ahlawat returned to films after four years. Leone's husband Daniel Weber also had a cameo appearance in the film as flight attendant. As the film revisits two very different eras, the attire worn by Leone was also carefully designed. Leone's personal stylist Hitesh Kapopara who has also designed costumes for Leone for her previous films went for shopping in the local markets of London and Rajasthan for traditional accessories.

Filming 

The film was shot at various location including Mumbai, London and Rajasthan. In Rajasthan, it was filmed at remote interiors and villages. At Jodhpur, the sand dunes were also included in the shoot along with the villagers for a song sequence. A village was also created on the desert to commence the filming. The Khimsar Fort in Nagaur, Laxmi Niwas Palace of Bikaner were also included into the shots and were used as royal palace in the film. Reportedly, Sunny got skin infection on the sets as she has to shoot in the scorching heat and had rashes over the body. Leone also learnt Rajasthani dialect for the film. She attended workshops for the song "Dhol Baaje" and learnt classical dance steps from the veteran choreographer Saroj Khan. As per reports, she also had to bath with 100 litres of milk for a scene in the film.

Soundtrack 

The music for the film was composed by Dr. Zeus, Amaal Mallik, Meet Bros Anjjan, Tony Kakkar and Uzair Jaswal with lyrics penned by Kumaar, Manoj Muntashir and Tony Kakkar. The background score was composed by Mannan Munjal. The soundtrack comprises 9 songs. Ensemble singers like Tulsi Kumar, Arijit Singh, Kanika Kapoor, Monali Thakur, Meet Bros Anjjan, Mohit Chauhan, Neha Kakkar and Pakistani singer Uzair Jaswal have lent their voices for the film. The first song titled "Desi Look" was released as single on 19 February 2015. The full soundtrack album was released on 10 March 2015.

Critical response 
The soundtrack of Ek Paheli Leela received generally positive review from the music critics. Critic Rajiv Vijayakar from Bollywood Hungama gave the album a rating of 3 stars out of 5 and felt, "Some tracks will help the film, some will be helped by the film, but the rest are largely fillers. With four of the nine tracks being re-creations, the score gets a fillip in theory. " Kasmin Fernandes of The Times of India gave a rating of 4 and commented, "The originals stand out more than adaptations here." Joginder Tuteja of Rediff gave three stars, and commented, "The music of Ek Paheli Leela has a good mix of party and romantic numbers. It's the original numbers in the soundtrack that do better than the adapted versions. Play this one when you want some variety; it has a good mix of party and romantic numbers." BizAsia gave a rating of 7.5 out of 10 to the album summarizing it as, "This album has the elements for an all-round entertainer designed and composed for the masses around the world using the best hit making formulas in the current industry... including recreating old hits." Glamsham awarded the album 3.5 stars out of 5 and stated, "Summing up, the audio of T-Series' Ek Paheli Leela meets the expectations with some potential chart toppers like 'Desi Look', 'Tere Bin Nahi Laage' and 'Saiyyan Superstar'. The 'getting popular' audio should aid the cause of this musical love saga, when Ek Paheli Leela releases all over this April." Radioandmusic.com called the album "a mixed one". Surabhi Redkar from Koimoi gave 2 stars and felt, "The music album of Ek Paheli Leela is not exactly a hit one. It has only certain songs that are worth listening" while picking "Tere Bin (Male)", "Khuda Bhi" and "Ek Do Teen as the best ones.

A remix album was made by DJ Chetas and was released on T-Series YouTube on 26 March 2015.

Reception

Box office 
The film was released on 10 April 2015 with estimated occupancy of 20% with greater occupancy in single screens than multiplexes. On its opening day it collected  beating the opening day collections of films like NH10, Shamitabh and Detective Byomkesh Bakshy. The film showed further growth on its third day as it collected  nett to take its first weekend total to around  nett.Till its second weekend, it managed to collect  nett. At the end of its theatrical run, Ek Paheli Leela grossed around  nett.

Critical reception 
The Times of India gave the film 3 stars out of 5 and described the film as "colourful, crisp and convivial". Bollywood Hungama gave the film 3.5 stars out of 5 and praised the film's cinematography, direction, screenplay and stated, "On the whole, Ek Paheli Leela is worth watching, purely because of Sunny Leone and the way she has been presented... like never before!!!" DNA India gave the film 2 stars and applauded Sunny's transformation of two characters and film's music while stating that, "Sunny Leone fans will be in for a royal treat. If Sunny Leone gets your temperature rising then Leela won't disappoint. The New Indian Express gave the film three and a half stars praising film's narration and stated, "Stunningly mounted and sumptuously narrated, "Ek Paheli Leela" is a feast for the senses. Basha Lal's camera caresses Ms Leone's assets and the sand dunes of Jaisalmer with equal affection. It may not be revolutionary in concept or path-breaking in execution. But make no mistake. "Ek Paheli Leela" is the surprise of the year.
Mid-Day called it "semi-porn rubbish",
while IBNLive gave it 1.5 stars stating that the dialog was full of crude sexual jokes and that it was "soft porn" emphasising the short skirts of the women and the physique of the men. The Hindustan Times  said the film had a " ludicrous script" and "wooden" acting. India Today praised the cinematography and Leone's dancing.
Mumbai Mirror   called it " an insincere, lavish and titillating compilation of every item song ever made." Rediff stated although the film was poorly written and had many flaws in its execution, it succeeded at its purpose of being a one-woman show to highlight Leone.
Indian Express gave the film zero stars stating "all this film wants to do is to exploit its leading lady's awe-inspiring stack... From as many angles as possible, the closer the better".  NDTV called it a "vapid yarn about love, desire and obsession unfolds against good-looking backgrounds".

See also
 Bollywood films of 2015
 Kuch Kuch Locha Hai

References

External links 
 
 
 
 Ek Paheli Leela at Google Play

2015 films
2010s Hindi-language films
2010s romantic thriller films
2015 thriller drama films
2015 romantic drama films
2010s romantic musical films
Films shot in Rajasthan
Films set in Rajasthan
Indian romantic drama films
T-Series (company) films
Indian romantic thriller films
Films scored by Meet Bros Anjjan
Films scored by Amaal Mallik
Indian romantic musical films
Films about reincarnation
Indian thriller drama films